Lincoln is a surname and masculine given name of Old English origin. The surname originates from the city of Lincoln, England, whose name means "lake/pool colony", combining the Brythonic word lynn with the Latin word colonia. This translates to town by the pool or settler by the lake. As a result of its use to honor Abraham Lincoln, Lincoln has become a somewhat prominent first name for males in the United States (#781 out of 1220, Top 6 2018).

Family of President Abraham Lincoln
Abraham Lincoln (1809–1865), the 16th United States president
Samuel Lincoln (c. 1622 – 1690), immigrant ancestor of the president
John Lincoln (1716–1788), great-grandfather of the president
Abraham Lincoln (captain) (1744–1786), grandfather of the president
Bathsheba Lincoln (1750–1836), grandmother of the president
Thomas Lincoln (1778–1851), father of the president
Nancy Lincoln (1784–1818), mother of the president
Thomas Lincoln Jr. (1812–1812), younger brother of the president
Mary Todd Lincoln (1818–1882), wife of the president
Robert Todd Lincoln (1843–1926), son of the president
Edward Baker Lincoln (1846–1850), son of the president
William Wallace Lincoln (1850–1862), son of the president
Tad Lincoln (1853–1871), son of the president
Mary Harlan Lincoln (1846–1937), daughter-in-law of the president
Abraham Lincoln II (1873–1890), grandson of the president
Gatewood Lincoln (1875–1957), first cousin once removed of the president and two-time governor of American Samoa

People with the surname Lincoln
Abbey Lincoln (born Anna Marie Wooldridge) (1930–2010) American jazz vocalist, songwriter, and actress
Andrew Lincoln (born Clutterbuck) (born 1973), English actor
Benjamin Lincoln (1733–1810), American Revolutionary War general
Blanche Lincoln (born 1960), Arkansas senator
Brad Lincoln (born 1985), American baseball pitcher
Elmo Lincoln (1889–1952), American film actor
Frederic Lincoln (disambiguation)
Georgianna Lincoln (born 1943), American politician
G. Gould Lincoln (1880–1974), American journalist
Harry J. Lincoln (1878–1937), American composer
Henry Lincoln (1930-2022), British author and actor
Holly Lincoln (born 1985), Canadian soccer forward
James Sullivan Lincoln (1811–1888), American portrait painter 
J. Virginia Lincoln (1915–2003), American physicist
Keith Lincoln (1939–2019), American football player
Lar Park Lincoln (born 1961), American actor
Martha D. Lincoln (1838–?), American author and journalist
Tribich Lincoln (1879–1943), Hungarian adventurer and con artist

People with the given name Lincoln

Lincoln Almond (1936-2022), American politician and attorney
Lincoln Bancroft (1877–1942), American politician
Lincoln J. Beachey (1887–1915), American aviator
Lincoln Brewster (born 1971), Christian recording artist
Lincoln Cássio de Souza Soares (born 1979), Brazilian footballer
Lincoln Corrêa dos Santos (born 2000), Brazilian footballer
Lincoln Chafee (born 1953), American politician
Lincoln Davis (born 1943), American politician
Lincoln Díaz-Balart (born 1954), American politician
Lincoln Ellsworth (1880–1951), American explorer
Lincoln Henrique Oliveira dos Santos (born 1998), Brazilian footballer
Lincoln Kennedy (born 1971), American footballer and broadcaster
Lincoln Kirstein (1907–1996), American artist
Lincoln Olivetti (1954–2015), Brazilian arranger and conductor
Lincoln Peirce (born 1963), American cartoonist and creator of Big Nate
Lincoln Perera (died 2010), Sri Lankan Sinhala civil servant
Lincoln Perry (1902–1985), American comedian and actor
Lincoln Ragsdale (1926–1995), American civil rights activist
Lincoln Fernando Rocha da Silva (born 1996), Brazilian footballer
Lincoln Steffens (1866–1936), American investigative journalist
Lincoln Wallen, British-American computer scientist
Lincoln Walsh (1903–1971), American inventor
Lincoln Williams (born 1993), Australian volleyball player
Lincoln Withers (born 1981), Australian rugby player
Lincoln Wolfenstein (1923–2015), American physicist

Fictional characters named Lincoln
Lincoln Loud, the main protagonist in The Loud House

References

English toponymic surnames
English masculine given names